Central Buton Regency is a new regency of Southeast Sulawesi established by separation from Buton Regency under Act No.15 of 2014, dated 23 July 2014. It covers an area of 837.08 km2 comprising the southern parts of Muna Island and Kabaena Island, together with several small offshore islands adjacent to the two main islands, with no territory located on Buton Island (a misnomer). It had a population of 86,112 at the 2010 Census and 114,773 at the 2020 Census; the official estimate as at mid 2021 was 116,599. The administrative centre lies at Labungkari.

Administrative districts
The Central Buton Regency is divided into seven districts (kecamatan), tabulated below with their areas and 2010 and 2020 Census populations, together with the official estimates as at mid 2021. The table also includes the location of the administrative centre of each district, the number of administrative villages (rural desa and urban kelurahan) and small offshore islands in each district, and its post code.

The new Regency thus comprises six districts in the southern part of Muna Island together with one district (Talaga Raya) in the southern part of Kabaena Island. It notably does not contain any portion of Buton Island.

Note: (a) Talaga Raya District comprises the southern part of Kabaena Island together with two smaller islands off its south-east coast - Talaga Besar (Great Talaga) and Talaga Kecil (Little Talaga); over 60% of the district's population inhabit Talaga Kecil, which contained 7,836 inhabitants (at the 2020 Census) in its area of 3.29 km2.

References

External links
 

Regencies of Southeast Sulawesi
2014 establishments in Indonesia